is a railway station on the Keikyu Main Line in Ōta, Tokyo, Japan, operated by the private railway operator Keikyu. It is numbered "KK10".

Lines

Layout
The station has two elevated side platforms serving two tracks. Before the station was rebuilt, the station was long enough to only handle 4-car trains.

Platforms

History
The station opened on 1 February 1901.

Keikyu introduced station numbering to its stations on 21 October 2010; Umeyashiki was assigned station number KK10.

The station was rebuilt with elevated tracks, completed in October 2012.

Passenger statistics
In fiscal 2011, the station was used by an average of 13,542 passengers daily.

Surrounding area
 Umeyashiki Park
 Toho University Omori Campus
 Tokyo Biotechnology College
 Ota City General Gymnasium

See also
 List of railway stations in Japan

References

External links

  

Railway stations in Tokyo
Stations of Keikyu
Railway stations in Japan opened in 1901